Catherin Michell Berni Noble (born 30 June 1994) is a Uruguayan footballer who plays as a forward for Club Plaza Colonia de Deportes. She has been a member of the Uruguay women's national team.

International career
Berni made her senior debut for Uruguay on 5 March 2013 in a 3–3 friendly draw against Zimbabwe. She also played the 2018 Copa América Femenina.

References

1994 births
Living people
Women's association football forwards
Uruguayan women's footballers
People from San José de Mayo
Uruguay women's international footballers
C.A. Cerro players
Colón F.C. players
Club Plaza Colonia de Deportes players